Colas Rail  is a railway infrastructure and rail freight company primarily active in the United Kingdom. It is a subsidiary of the French industrial group Bouygues.

Colas Rail was originally created as Seco Rail, named after its then-parent company SECO (Société d'Études et de Construction d'Outillage). In the twentieth century, its main activities were railway construction and maintenance. Seco Rail participated in various major projects, such as in the construction of phase one of High Speed 1. During 2006, it became a rail freight operator in the British market, initially transporting aggregates using leased rolling stock. Seco Rail acquired its first locomotives and regular freight customer, Kronospan, during the following year. In early 2008, Colas Group opted to reorganise its rail subsidiaries following recent acquisitions, merging Seco Rail with AMEC-Spie and Carillion Rail's former plant division under the name Colas Rail.

During the late 2000s and early 2010s, Colas Rail continued to pick up more freight services, becoming involved in the haulage of coal and steel amongst other traffics. Further locomotives, such as Class 56s, Class 66s and Class 70s, were acquired from various sources. In April 2013, Colas formed a joint venture with the British transport conglomerate Go-Ahead Group to bid for the Docklands Light Railway concession, but withdrew from the endeavour later that year. By late 2016, Colas Rail was amongst the five largest contractors to Network Rail, and had 1,500 staff in the UK alone. During the 2010s, Colas Rail was engaged as the primary contractor for the Al Boraq Moroccan high speed rail line. Other projects included major improvement works at London Waterloo station and the West Midlands Metro, as well as the construction of the Contournement Nîmes – Montpellier high speed line in France.

History

Colas Rail was originally established as Seco Rail, drawing its name from the UK subsidiary of the French railway engineering company SECO (Société d'Études et de Construction d'Outillage). During the twentieth century, it was mostly concentrated on activities such as track maintenance, line construction, and urban transport services.

During 2000, SECO was acquired by the road construction company Colas Group. Whilst its activities has been historically centred around France, the company also operated subsidiaries in both the UK and Belgium. Amongst its achievements in the British market was its involvement in the construction of High Speed 1, having provided the detailed detail, supply, and installation of 46 miles of track, overhead electrification, and other systems during the first phase of the project.

During 2006, it became a train operator, initially focusing on the transportation of aggregates. In the following year, Colas became responsible for the Kronospan timber trains from Carlisle to Chirk, which was previously in the hands of AMEC-Spie and subsequently became Colas' first regular freight contract; it was operated using hired-in locomotives. Also during 2007, Colas purchased three Class 47 diesel locomotives from the freight operator England Wales Scotland (EWS); all three were overhauled at Eastleigh Works ahead of commencing operations in September 2007 on railhead treatment trains in South West England on behalf of the national rail infrastructure owner Network Rail.

In January 2008, Colas Group also acquired the Plant division of Carillion Rail, comprising 12 tampers, three regulators, one locomotive, one 125T Kirow Crane, 16 switch-handling units (Pem/Lem), and the freehold of the Mill Lane Plant Depot in Rugby, making the company the owner of the largest fleet of modern on-track plant in the UK. Accordingly, the company decided to reorganise its rail operations, during which Seco Rail was merged with both Carillion Rail and another recently-purchased rail subsidiary, AMEC-Spie; the new entity operated under the Colas Rail branding. 

During late 2008, Colas Rail commenced operating steel trains from Immingham to Washwood Heath, hauled by Class 56 locomotives hired from Hanson Traction. In mid-2009, on behalf of a separate customer, it commenced a further steel flow from Burton upon Trent to Dollands Moor, which was hauling by the company's own Class 47s.

In late 2009, Colas leased four Class 66 (66 841–66 844) diesel locomotives that had last been used by the collapsed operator Advenza Freight. These were joined by 66 845 which had last been used by Direct Rail Services. As a consequence of their owners concluding a deal to lease all five locomotives to the British freight operator GB Railfreight, Colas purchased five replacement locomotives (66 846–66 850, formerly 66 573- 66 577) that had previously been operated by Freightliner. This rolling stock rearrangement coincided with Colas' entering of the UK coal haulage market during the summer of 2011.

During December 2011, Colas launched a new service on behalf of Kronospan, moving timber from Gloucester to Newton Abbot, typically hauled by its Class 66 fleet. In late 2012, a single Class 86 electric locomotive (86 701) was briefly operated by the company on a trial service on the West Coast Main Line, hauling former First Great Western Motorail wagons; two years later, a similar trial service was conducted using a Class 60 locomotive instead.

During April 2012, Colas purchased four Class 56 locomotives. By January 2014, the company had a total of 11 members of the type in its inventory. During May 2012, it also purchased the Pullman Rail rolling stock maintenance business based in Cardiff.

In April 2013, Colas formed a joint venture with the British transport conglomerate Go-Ahead Group to bid for the concession to operate the Docklands Light Railway franchise, and was successfully short-listed during the competitive bidding process. However, during August 2013, it was announced that the bid had been withdrawn.

In November 2013, Colas placed an order for ten Class 70 diesel locomotives with the American railway manufacturer GE Transportation. Around the same time, it separately purchased four Class 37 locomotives formerly in preservation to return them to mainline operations.

During 2014, Colas Rail purchased ten Class 60 locomotives from DB Schenker, the deal included an option to purchase a further ten at a later date. In mid-2015, it made preparations to commence operating infrastructure trains on behalf of Network Rail; as a part of these preparations, a further four Class 37s were purchased by Colas to haul them. By late 2016, Colas Rail was amongst the five largest contractors to Network Rail, and had 1,500 staff in the UK alone.

In December 2017, Colas Rail sold its three Class 47 locomotives to GB Railfreight, as they had been deemed to be no longer useful to its core operations. During July 2018, it also sold all ten of its Class 60 locomotives to GB Railfreight.

During the 2010s, Colas Rail was active as the primary contractor for the Al Boraq Moroccan high speed rail line, being responsible for the delivery of the railway infrastructure. It was also one of several contractors that were engaged in major improvement works at London Waterloo station during the mid-to-late 2010s. The company has also been involved in delivering enhancements to the West Midlands Metro. Colas Rail was also one of the companies involved in delivering the Contournement Nîmes – Montpellier French high speed line. It has also stated its interest in, and has advocated for, the High Speed 2 project.

In 2018, Colas Rail publicly called for Network Rail to provide greater certainty on future rail freight paths, stating that investment in new services, such as rail-based parcel traffic, was being jeopardised by a lack of safeguards on capacity.

During August 2021, Colas announced the sale of its Pullman Rail engineering operation to the government-owned not-for-profit organisation Transport for Wales.

In February 2022, it conducted a trial service hauling timber from Devon to Monmouthshire on behalf of Euroforest Ltd.

Fleet details

Colas Rail owns and operates a mixed fleet of on-track plant for maintenance operations. By 2016, this fleet was reportedly the largest of its type in the UK.

Current fleet

Past fleet

References

External links
 
 Colas Rail home page
 Colas Rail UK home page
 Colas Rail wins Algiers metro rail extension

Bouygues
Post-privatisation British railway companies
Rail freight companies in the United Kingdom
Railway companies of France
2007 establishments in England